Golda Fried  (born 17 November 1972) is a Canadian/American poet, short story writer,  novelist and teacher.

Biography
Raised in Toronto, Canada and later graduated from York Mills Collegiate Institute, she received her undergraduate degree from McGill University in Film and Communications and her masters in English and Creative Writing from Concordia University, both in Montreal. In 1993, she received third prize in poetry for the Student Writing Awards from Books in Canada. While living in Montreal, she was involved in many spoken word events including the Lollapalooza festival in 1994. Also, in 1994 she won The Chester Macnaghten Prize in Creative Writing from McGill University.

Her fiction and poetry have appeared in Prism international, Broken Pencil, Blood and Aphorisms, Sub-terrain, Fish piss, Matrix, the Moosehead Anthology. Her collection of stories, Darkness Then a Blown Kiss, was published in 1998 and was listed as one of the ten best books of the year by NOW magazine. Her first novel, Nellcott Is My Darling, also named Top 10 in 2005 by TimeOut Chicago and NOW, was selected as a finalist for a 2005 Governor General's Awards for Fiction. In 1999, she moved to Greensboro, North Carolina, where she currently resides as an assistant professor of expository and creative writing.

Work

Stories online
"Icebox Night"
"And It All Went Tremola"

Non-fiction
Open Letters Nov. 15th 2000

Short story
Darkness Then a Blown Kiss with illustrations by Vesna Mostovac and edited by Ken Sparling

Fiction
NOVEL: Nellcott is my Darling edited by Alana Wilcox

Zines/ chapbooks
"Hartley's Stories" by Conundrum press
"As If From The Mountains" by Conundrum press
Kiss Machine Presents: Summer Ink: An Illustrated Book of Letters with illustrations by Vesna Mostovac
"Check the Floor" published by Alpha Beat Press

Poetry/spoken word
The Mundane and the Sun (or Advice From The Therapist)
CD compilation: Wired on Words
Money

Anthologized work
Shortfuse: The Global Anthology of Fusion Poetry (Ed. Todd Swift and Philip Norton)
Poetry Nation: The North American Anthology of Fusion (Ed. Todd Swift and Regie Cabico)
"The Diner" in The Diner Anthology
"Crates of Stars" in Concrete Forest: The New Fiction of Urban Canada (Ed. Hal Niedzviecki)
"Lindsey" in Can't Lit: Fearless Fiction by Broken Pencil Magazine (Ed. Richard Rosenbaum)
"Cigarette Mapping"Revival: Spoken Word from Lolapalooza 1994 (Ed. Juliette Torrez and Nicole Blackman)
The Portable Conundrum (Ed. Andy Brown)
Burning Ambitions: The Anthology of Short Stories Edited by Debbie James

References

External links 
Book review by Bert Archer of Nellcott is my Darling
Hour Review
Review of Nellcott is my Darling in the McGill news
Golda Fried: Author Interview with M.E Wood
www.ukula.com - Article on Conundrum Press's Tenth Anniversary featuring Golda Fried

1972 births
Living people
20th-century Canadian poets
Canadian women poets
Canadian women novelists
American emigrants to Canada
Place of birth missing (living people)
McGill University alumni
Concordia University alumni
Writers from Greensboro, North Carolina
Writers from Toronto
20th-century Canadian novelists
20th-century Canadian women writers